Portrait of Alphonse Leroy is a 1783 portrait of doctor and man-midwife Alphonse Leroy by Jacques-Louis David, now in the Musée Fabre in Montpellier, which bought it in 1829.

It shows its subject looking towards the spectator and leaning on a closed copy of Hippocrates' Morbi mulierum, a work on women's illnesses. On the desk is a 'lampe à quinquet', invented by Leroy himself. Together the lamp and book make reference to Cesare Ripa's Iconologia, which states these are the attributes of a study.

The naturalistic attention to detail and its bright tonality show how David was influenced by Flemish painters during his 1781 stay in Flanders. One of his pupils, Jean-François Garneray, assisted in painting the hands and fabrics. It was first exhibited at the Paris Salon of 1783.

Bibliography (in French)
Antoine Schnapper, David : Témoin de son temps, Fribourg, Office du Livre, 1980 [détail des éditions]
Antoine Schnapper (ed.) and Arlette Sérullaz, Jacques-Louis David 1748-1825 : catalogue de l'exposition rétrospective Louvre-Versailles 1989-1990, Paris, Réunion des musées nationaux, 1989
Luc de Nanteuil, David, Paris, Cercle d'Art, coll. « les grands peintres », 1987
Régis Michel and Marie-Catherine Sahut, David : L'art et le politique, Paris, Gallimard, coll. « Découvertes Gallimard / Arts » (nº 46), 1988
Sophie Monneret, David et le néoclassicisme, Paris, Terrail, 1998
Simon Lee, David, Paris, Phaidon, 2002

Leroy, Alphonse
Leroy, Alphonse
Leroy, Alphonse
1783 paintings
Paintings in the collection of the Musée Fabre